The 2021–22 EuroCup Basketball season was the 20th season of Euroleague Basketball's secondary level professional club basketball tournament. It was the 14th season since it was renamed from the ULEB Cup to the EuroCup, and the sixth season under the title sponsorship name of 7DAYS.

Team allocation 
A total of 20 teams from 10 leagues participated in the 2021–22 EuroCup Basketball.

Teams 
League positions after playoffs of the previous season shown in parentheses.

Notes

Round and draw dates 
The schedule of the competition was as follows.

Draw 
The draw was held on 9 July 2021 in Barcelona, Spain.

The 20 teams were drawn into two groups of 10, with the restriction that teams from the same league could not be drawn against each other, except when there were more than two teams from the same league participating in the regular season. For the draw, the teams were seeded into 10 pots, in accordance with the Club Ranking, based on their performance in European competitions during a three-year period and the lowest possible position that any club from that league can occupy in the draw is calculated by adding the results of the worst performing team from each league.

The fixtures were decided after the draw, using a computer draw not shown to public, with the following match sequence:

Note: Positions for scheduling do not use the seeding pots, e.g., Team 1 is not necessarily the team from Pot 1 in the draw.

There were scheduling restrictions: for example, teams from the same city in general were not scheduled to play at home on the same round (to avoid them playing at home on the same day or on consecutive days, due to logistics and crowd control).

Regular season 

The 20 teams were divided into two groups of 10 teams each. In each group, teams played against each other home-and-away in a round-robin format for a total of 18 games played by each team. The top eight teams from each group advanced to the playoffs, while the last two teams from each group were eliminated. The regular season started on 19 October 2021 and ended on 6 April 2022.

Group A

Standings

Results

Group B

Standings

Results

Playoffs

Bracket

Eighthfinals

Quarterfinals

Semifinals

Final

Statistics

Individual statistics

Rating 

Source: EuroCup

Points 

Source: EuroCup

Rebounds 

Source: EuroCup

Assists 

Source: EuroCup

Blocks 

Source: EuroCup

Other statistics

Individual game highs

Team statistics

Awards

EuroCup MVP

EuroCup Final MVP

All–7DAYS EuroCup Teams

Coach of the Year

Rising Star

MVP of the Round

Regular season

Playoffs

Attendances to arenas

Average attendances

See also 
 2021–22 EuroLeague
 2021–22 Basketball Champions League
 2021–22 FIBA Europe Cup

References

External links 
 Official website

 
EuroCup Basketball seasons